Longwood is a closed station located in the town of Longwood, on the North East line, in Victoria, Australia. A former passing loop, with the same name, was located nearby.

The station opened on 20 November 1872, as the temporary northern terminus of the line. A large goods shed was provided, with a station building erected in 1878. In 1885, a signal cabin was provided on the platform, being incorporated into the station building in 1916, and a crossing loop provided in 1926. The station was one of 35 closed to passenger traffic on 4 October 1981, as part of the New Deal timetable for country passengers. In 1987, a number of points at the station were spiked normal, and later removed.

References

External links
 Photo: Station in 1984

Disused railway stations in Victoria (Australia)